Unión Deportiva Telde is a Spanish football team based in Telde, eastern Gran Canaria in the autonomous community of Canary Islands. Founded in 1965, it plays in Preferente Interinsular – Group 1, holding home matches at Estadio Municipal Pablo Hernández Morales, commonly known as El Hornillo.

Season to season

4 seasons in Segunda División B
27 seasons in Tercera División

External links
 
ArefePedia team profile 
Soccerway team profile

Football clubs in the Canary Islands
Association football clubs established in 1965
1965 establishments in Spain
Sport in Gran Canaria